Psittacanthus gigas is a mistletoe (family Loranthaceae) native to Colombia. It was discovered in 1984 by Alwyn Gentry.

References 

Loranthaceae